The 1955–56 season was Manchester United's 54th season in the Football League, and their 11th consecutive season in the top division of English football.

A United side consisted mostly of players in their late teens and early twenties finished the season as league champions 11 points ahead of their nearest rivals Blackpool and Wolves.

Right-half Eddie Colman made his debut for United this season, first featuring in the league match against Bolton Wanderers at Burnden Park on 12 November 1955 and was soon a regular partner to Duncan Edwards in the United half-back positions. Colman's breakthrough forced Jeff Whitefoot out of the team and contributed to his transfer to Grimsby Town in the summer of 1956, while long-serving goalkeeper Jack Crompton played his final game for United this season.

First Division

FA Cup

Squad statistics

References

Manchester United F.C. seasons
Manchester United
1956